Najmieh Hospital is located in Tehran, Iran. The hospital is situated south of Jomhuri, on Hafez Street. Its original building belongs to early-Pahlavi architectural style. On 4 August 2003 it was declared part of the Iranian Cultural Heritage and registered under number 9494. Najmieh is also on the list of Iranian Endowment Organization.

History 
The founder of the Hospital endowment was Malektaj Firuz (Najm-es Saltaneh). She was the daughter of a Qajar prince Nosrat-od-Dowleh Firouz Mirza. Najm-es Saltaneh was wife of Mirza Hidayatu'llah Vazir-Daftar. Though by now advanced in age, she supervised the actual day-to-day process of construction of the hospital. She made Mohammad Mosaddegh and his descendants the custodians of the hospital with the proviso that the custody would go to her other son Abolhassan Diba after the passing away of Mohammad Mossadegh. During his lifetime Moḥammad Moṣsadegh was the custodian of the hospital, a responsibility that was passed on to his half-brother. Upon the latter's demise, Missadegh's sons, Ahmad and Gholam-Hossein and later on his grandson, Maḥmoud assumed the tadks. Najm-al-Salṭana also took the unprecedented step of making her eldest daughter the supervisor of the endowment, to be succeeded thereafter by her other daughters and their descendants. 

Najmieh was the first modern private hospital in Tehran with a special fund earmarked for the care of poor patients.

References 

Hospitals in Iran